Pavani may refer to:

Pavani (raga), a rāga in Carnatic music
Pavani Parameswara Rao (1933–2017), Senior Advocate practising in the Supreme Court of India
Gullipilli Sowria Raj v. Bandaru Pavani, an Indian Supreme Court ruling in a lawsuit involving the legality of the marriage to a Hindu woman of a Christian
Pavani, character in Vennela
Andrea Pavani (born 1954), Italian curler
Enea Pavani (1920–1998), Italian curler